Society Fever is a 1935 American romantic comedy film directed by Frank R. Strayer and starring Lois Wilson, Lloyd Hughes and Hedda Hopper. The film entered the public domain in 1964, because its copyright was not renewed.

Plot 
A mother starts to get worried when she finds out that some wealthy friends have been invited to dinner with her somewhat screwball family.

Cast
 Lois Wilson as Portia Prouty 
 Lloyd Hughes as Graham Smith 
 Hedda Hopper as Mrs. Vandergriff  
 Guinn 'Big Boy' Williams as Edgar Prouty  
 Grant Withers as Ronald Dawson  
 Marion Shilling as Victoria Vandergriff  
 George Irving as Mr. Vandergriff  
 Sheila Terry as Lucy Prouty  
 Maidel Turner as Mrs. Prouty  
 Lois January as Julie Prouty  
 Erville Alderson as Uncle Andy 
 Kathryn Sheldon as Minnie  
 Reginald Sheffield as Lord Michael  
 Shirley Hill as Marjorie Vandergriff 
 Lew Kelly as Hanly  
 Anthony Marsh as Alan Prouty 
 Richard Hemingway as Bob Miller  
 Robert McKenzie as Bill Collector

References

Bibliography
 Michael R. Pitts. Poverty Row Studios, 1929–1940: An Illustrated History of 55 Independent Film Companies, with a Filmography for Each. McFarland & Company, 2005.

External links
 

1935 films
1935 romantic comedy films
American romantic comedy films
Films directed by Frank R. Strayer
Chesterfield Pictures films
1930s English-language films
1930s American films